Bonaventure is a Montreal Metro station in the borough of Ville-Marie in Montreal, Quebec, Canada. It is operated by the Société de transport de Montréal (STM) and serves the Orange Line. It opened on February 13, 1967, four months after most of the initial network. It served as the western terminus of the Orange Line for 14 years until the extension to Place-Saint-Henri station opened in 1980.

Overview 

Designed by Victor Prus, the station is a normal side platform station, built by cut-and-cover in order to provide a large space for the heavily trafficked mezzanine. As a key part of the underground city, the mezzanine has ticket barriers on either side to allow pedestrians to pass from one end of the station to the other side. Footbridges over the tracks below the mezzanine level allow passengers to cross from one platform to the other.

Until 1992, the station had only one outdoor entrance, in front of Windsor Station, and two additional accesses led directly to Place Bonaventure and Montreal Central Station (Gare Centrale) on one end, and the Château Champlain and Place du Canada on the other. When 1000 de La Gauchetière was built almost directly above the station, additional accesses were added to the office tower and to the Downtown Terminus (metropolitan bus terminal for Réseau de transport de Longueuil and South Shore buses) within it, as well as a street entrance on the western side of the building on Cathédrale Street and improved access to Central Station and Place Bonaventure.

The station is intermodal with the Réseau de transport métropolitain (RTM)'s commuter train lines through its underground access to Montreal Central Station, the terminus for Mascouche and Mont-Saint-Hilaire lines. Eventually, it will  connect also to the Réseau express métropolitain network. There is also underground access to the Lucien-L'Allier train station and to the Lucien-L'Allier Metro station.

Elevators were added between the mezzanine and the platforms in November 2009, making the station more accessible to people with reduced mobility. However, no step-free access to the surface was possible until 2019, when elevators were added connecting the mezzanine level to Terminus Centre-Ville and to the lobby of 1000 De La Gauchetière. This was criticised in the media. The elevators do not allow passengers to change platforms unless they exit the ticket barriers. Another elevator connecting the station to Place du Canada and the Château Champlain, formerly the only elevator in the system, is separated from the mezzanine level by steps.

The station is equipped with the MétroVision information screens, which display news, commercials, and the time until the next train.

Origin of the name
This station is named for Place Bonaventure, a major commercial complex containing businesses, the Hôtel Bonaventure (formerly a Hilton Hotel), and the Société de transport de Montréal's headquarters. This was named for Bonaventure Station, a former station on the Grand Trunk Railway, which in turn was named for its location on Saint Bonaventure Street, now Saint Jacques Street. All derive their name from St. Bonaventure, a 13th-century Italian philosopher and mystic.

Connecting bus routes

Nearby points of interest

Connected via the underground city

 Terminus Centre-Ville
 1000 de La Gauchetière
 Place Ville Marie
 Place Bonaventure
 Place du Canada - Hôtel Château Champlain
 Central Station - Via Rail, Amtrak and AMT
 Canadian National Railway headquarters
 Queen Elizabeth Hotel
 STM headquarters (in Place Bonaventure)

 Le 1250 René-Lévesque Ouest
 Édifice Gare Windsor - former Canadian Pacific Railway headquarters
 Bell Centre
 Lucien-L'Allier train station and Lucien-L'Allier Metro station and points west
 Square-Victoria-OACI Metro station and points east
 McGill Metro station and points north

Other
 Mary, Queen of the World Cathedral
 The Montreal Planetarium, now closed for relocation
 Sun Life Building
 Centre Sheraton
 Tour CIBC
 Place du Canada
 Dorchester Square

See also 
 Line 3 Red
 Réseau express métropolitain

References

External links

 Bonaventure Station - official site
 Terminus Centre-Ville official site
 Montreal by Metro, metrodemontreal.com - photos, information, and trivia
 2011 STM system map
 2011 Downtown System Map
 Metro Map

Accessible Montreal Metro stations
Orange Line (Montreal Metro)
Railway stations in Canada opened in 1967
Downtown Montreal